Nigerian Bottling Company is a beverage firm that is the franchise bottler of Coca-Cola in Nigeria. The firm has also owned the Nigerian franchise to market Fanta, Sprite, Schweppes, Ginger Ale, Limca, Krest, Parle Soda and Five Alive.

Nigerian Bottling Company also known has NBC, started production in 1953 at the basement facilities of the mainland Hotel, owned by Leventis Group producing Coke licensed from Coca Cola Company. In 1960, NBC introduced Fanta orange drink into the market and later Sprite lemon drink.

Marketing and distribution

NBC has eight bottling facilities in Nigeria which provide supplies to various depots for onward distribution to wholesalers or dealers. Over the years, NBC has established or acquired factories producing raw materials in its supply chain. It established a maize farm at Agenebode, Edo State to produce fructose syrup, acquired interest in Crown cork facilities in Ijebu Ode and a glass making factory in Delta State.

Nigeria Bottle Company serves 600 million consumers across broad with a geographical footprint of 28 countries on 3 continents. 

NBC produces more SKU's than its primary competitor, Seven-Up, it markets Coke, Coke zero, Fanta orange, Fanta apple, Eva water etc.

References

Drink companies of Nigeria
Food and drink companies based in Lagos
1953 establishments in Nigeria
Food and drink companies established in 1953